Sahr Senesie (born 20 June 1985) is a German former professional footballer who played as a forward.

Biography
Born in Koindu, Sierra Leone, Senesie moved to Germany in 1997. He is the half-brother of footballer defender Antonio Rüdiger.

Club career
In Germany, Senesie was scouted by Borussia Dortmund youth coach while playing street football. The coach brought him to the Borussia Dortmund  youth team. During his first season with the youth team, Senesie was the team leading scorer. He joined the Borussia Dortmund under-19 youth and lead the teams to two junior Bundesliga titles. After several successful seasons with the youth team, Senesie moved to the senior Bourussia Dortmund team in 2005. After 24 appearances for the senior team, he had loan spells with Grasshopper Club Zürich and TSG 1899 Hoffenheim. He returned to Dortmund but was released in 2008.

In 2008, he had a trial with Nottingham Forest but failed to impress manager Colin Calderwood. On 15 November he signed a contract with SV Eintracht Trier 05. Two years later he moved to FC Homburg, where he spent one season, leaving in 2011 after the club were relegated from the Regionalliga West. He then signed for SV Wacker Burghausen, where he spent two seasons before signing for SG Sonnenhof Großaspach in July 2013. On 1 June 2014, Senesie scored the only goal in the second leg of the promotion playoff away at VfL Wolfsburg II. As the first leg had ended 0–0, this was enough for Großaspach to secure promotion to the 3. Liga.

International career
Senesie has represented Germany – his adopted home – at various youth levels. He was a prominent player for the German U-20 side that participated at the 2005 Under-20 World Cup.

References

External links
 
 
 

1985 births
Living people
German footballers
Germany under-21 international footballers
Germany youth international footballers
Naturalized citizens of Germany
Sierra Leonean emigrants to Germany
German people of Sierra Leonean descent
German sportspeople of African descent
Borussia Dortmund players
Borussia Dortmund II players
Grasshopper Club Zürich players
TSG 1899 Hoffenheim players
German expatriate footballers
Expatriate footballers in Switzerland
German expatriate sportspeople in Switzerland
SV Eintracht Trier 05 players
FC 08 Homburg players
SV Wacker Burghausen players
SG Sonnenhof Großaspach players
Bundesliga players
3. Liga players
Swiss Super League players
Association football wingers
Association football forwards